Piebald refers to an animal coloring that is spotted.

Piebald may also refer to:

 Piebald (band), an American alternative rock band
 Piebaldism, a pigmentation disorder in humans